Michael Rudd is a New Zealand performance poet. He won a number of poetry slams during the time he spent living in Australia, and was a finalist in the Poetry Olympics.

Michael Rudd is also a prolific poetry-events organiser having established numerous poetry reading and open mic nights over the years, around Auckland in NZ and in Melbourne and Sydney in Australia.

He is well known for his role in MCing the Going West Poetry Slam, which has been running annually in West Auckland since 2004, and for organising the first New Zealand National Poetry Slam.

References

Year of birth missing (living people)
Living people
New Zealand poets
New Zealand male poets